Mount Hamilton may refer to:

Mountains
 Mount Hamilton (Antarctica)
 Mount Hamilton (California)
 Mount Hamilton (Nevada), in the White Pine Range
 Mount Hamilton (New Zealand), a mountain in New Zealand
 Mount Hamilton, Victoria, a volcano in Victoria, Australia
 Mount Hamilton, County Antrim, a townland in County Antrim, Northern Ireland